The 1997 African U-17 Championship was a football competition organized by the Confederation of African Football (CAF). The tournament took place in Botswana. It also served as CAF's qualifier for the 1997 FIFA U-17 World Championship in Egypt, who automatically qualified as host. As Egypt won this tournament, third placed-team Ghana qualified.

Qualification

Qualified teams

 (host nation)

Group stage

Group A
{| cellpadding="0" cellspacing="0" width="100%"
|-
|width="60%"|

Group B
{| cellpadding="0" cellspacing="0" width="100%"
|-
|width="60%"|

Knock-out stage

Semi-finals

For winning their semi-final, Mali qualified for the 1997 FIFA U-17 World Championship

Third place match

For winning the third place match, Ghana qualified for the 1997 FIFA U-17 World Championship with Ethiopia missing out.

Final

Winners

Countries to participate in 1997 FIFA U-17 World Championship
The 3 teams which qualified for 1997 FIFA U-17 World Championship.

 (qualified as host)

References

External links
RSSSF.com
Confederation of African Football

Africa U-17 Cup of Nations
under
African Under-17 Championship
International association football competitions hosted by Botswana
Football competitions in Botswana
Football in Gaborone
1997 in youth association football